Ours Is Chrome is the second and thus far final studio album by American alternative rock band Superheaven, released on May 4, 2015. The snake on the cover is a DeKay's brown snake (Storeria dekayi).

Track listing

Personnel
Superheaven
 Taylor Madison – guitar, vocals
 Jake Clarke – guitar, vocals
 Joe Kane – bass
 Zack Robbins – drums

Additional personnel
 Will Yip – production, mixing, background vocals, additional percussion 
 Matthew Bailey – additional percussion
 Vince Ratti – mixing
 Jay Preston – assisting engineering

Charts

References

Superheaven albums
2015 albums
Albums produced by Will Yip